The  was a class of auxiliary minelayers of the Imperial Japanese Navy (IJN), serving during the 1910s and World War II. They were called the Sokuten class from their nameship. They were also called the Toshima class after Sokuten was retired. In some sources Natsushima was included in this class.  Their official class name was not mentioned in IJN official documents.

Background
 The IJN intended to update their mineboats for local guards.

Construction
 In 1911, the IJN built the first experimental boat Natsushima (Natsushima Maru). Natsushima attached importance to gun-fights. Therefore, she was equipped with two  Armstrong guns.
 In 1913, the IJN built the second experimental boat Sokuten (Sokuten Maru No. 1). She was an improved model of Natsushima, and her equipment was almost the same as Natsushima.
 The IJN adopted Sokutens hull design, and started production. 
 Kuroshima, Kurokami and Kurosaki were equipped with netlayer facilities. However, those armaments were not announced.

Service history
Natsushima was retired in 1927, and Sokuten was retired in 1936. The other sisters participated to World War II, and nine boats survived the war.

Ships in class

Photos

Footnotes

Bibliography
, History of Pacific War Vol. 51, "The truth histories of the Imperial Japanese Vessels Part-2", Gakken (Japan), June 2002, 
Ships of the World special issue Vol. 45, Escort Vessels of the Imperial Japanese Navy, (Japan), February 1996
The Maru Special, Japanese Naval Vessels No. 47, "Japanese naval mine warfare crafts",  (Japan), January 1981
Editorial Committee of the Navy, Navy Vol. 11, "Part of small vessels, auxiliary vessels, miscellaneous service ship and converted merchant ships, Seibunsha K.K. (Japan), August 1981

 
Minelayers of the Imperial Japanese Navy
Auxiliary ships of the Imperial Japanese Navy
Patrol vessels of the Japan Coast Guard
Ships of the Republic of China Navy
Ships of the People's Liberation Army Navy